Senator Cobián may refer to:

Alfonso Valdés Cobián (1890–1988), Senate of Puerto Rico
Ramón Valdés Cobián (1886–1962), Senate of Puerto Rico